Mickaël Ramon Malsa (born 12 October 1995) is a Malagasy 
Martiniquais professional footballer who plays as a midfielder for Süper Lig club Kasımpaşa S.K..

Club career 
Born in Paris, Malsa passed the youth ranks of FC Sochaux-Montbéliard. He made his full debut at 8 February 2014 in a 2–0 away defeat against Lille. Two weeks later he featured again in a league game against Valenciennes, which ended into a 2–2 draw.

In January 2015 Malsa moved to Royal Antwerp. After a short spell at US Avranches, he joined Fortuna Sittard in 2017.

On 23 July 2018, Malsa was loaned to Segunda División side Albacete Balompié, for one year. On 3 September of the following year, he joined fellow league team CD Mirandés on a permanent one-year deal.

On 22 July 2020, Malsa agreed to a four-year contract with La Liga side Levante UD. He made his debut in the category on 27 September, in a 3–1 away win over CA Osasuna, and scored his first goal in the top tier the following 18 April, but in a 5–1 home loss against Villarreal CF.

On 12 August 2022, after Levante's relegation, Malsa signed a four-year deal with Real Valladolid in the first division.

Career statistics

References

External links

1995 births
Living people
Footballers from Paris
Martiniquais footballers
Association football midfielders
Martinique international footballers
2014 Caribbean Cup players
Ligue 1 players
Ligue 2 players
Challenger Pro League players
La Liga players
Segunda División players
FC Sochaux-Montbéliard players
US Avranches players
Royal Antwerp F.C. players
Eerste Divisie players
Fortuna Sittard players
Albacete Balompié players
CD Mirandés footballers
Levante UD footballers
Real Valladolid players
French expatriate footballers
Martiniquais expatriate footballers
Expatriate footballers in Belgium
Expatriate footballers in Spain
French expatriate sportspeople in Belgium
French expatriate sportspeople in Spain
Martiniquais expatriate sportspeople in Belgium
Martiniquais expatriate sportspeople in Spain